Rajesh Choudhary is an Indian sports sailor. He won bronze medals in the 2002 Busan and 2006 Doha Asian Games in  the Laser Radial class.

References

Living people
Year of birth missing (living people)
Indian male sailors (sport)
Sailors at the 2002 Asian Games
Sailors at the 2006 Asian Games
Sailors at the 2010 Asian Games
Medalists at the 2002 Asian Games
Medalists at the 2006 Asian Games
Asian Games bronze medalists for India
Asian Games medalists in sailing
Recipients of the Arjuna Award